Kelynack (from , meaning "abundant with holly") is a settlement in west Cornwall, England, UK.

Geography
Kelynack is on the Penwith peninsula approximately four miles (6 km) north north-east of Land's End and one mile (1.6 km) south of St Just. It lies along the B3306 road which connects St Ives to the A30 road, and is the last settlement before the road joins the A30. Kelynack lies within the Cornwall Area of Outstanding Natural Beauty (AONB). Almost a third of Cornwall has AONB designation, with the same status and protection as a National Park. Kelynack is also the name of one of the three school houses at Cape Cornwall School.

History
Kelynack was mentioned in the Domesday Book where it was listed as Chelenoc, and as the Tithing of Kelynack in the Assize Rolls of 1284.

Kelynack Board School was opened on 2 June 1880 with accommodation for one hundred children. In November 1882 a government inspector reported that the ″scholars are very neat and well-conducted; they are, of course, very backward; but a good beginning has been made.″

Pronounced (KEY – LIE – NACK) or pronounced (KELY (As in rely) – NACK)

Toponymy
First recorded in the Domesday Book as Chelenoc, then Kelkennek (1284), Kellenyek (1286), Kellenek (1300), Kelleynek (1302), Kellenick (1346), Kalynack (1589 and 1732), Killenick (1842). The name means holly grove.

References

External links
 

Hamlets in Cornwall
St Just in Penwith